Cut and run is a phrase meaning to "hurry off" typically used pejoratively in politics in reference to withdrawing troops from a conflict.

Cut and run may also refer to:
Cut and Run (film), a 1985 Italian film
CUT&RUN (biology), a molecular biology technique